Samia Suluhu Hassan became President of Tanzania on 19 March 2021 following the sudden death of John Magufuli. She travelled extensively to various multi-lateral meetings on behalf of Magufuli when she was Vice-President. The following is a list of international presidential trips made by Samia Suluhu since assuming office.

Summary of international trips

2021 
The following international trips were made by Samia Suluhu in 2021.

2022 
The following international trips were made by Samia Suluhu in 2022.

2023 
The following international trips were made by Samia Suluhu in 2023.

References 

Samia Suluhu
2021 in international relations
Suluhu, Samia
Suluhu, Samia
 
Suluhu, Samia
Suluhu